The 1994 Purdue Boilermakers football team represented Purdue University as a member of the Big Ten Conference during the 1994 NCAA Division I-A football season. Led by fourth-year head coach Jim Colletto, the Boilermakers finished the season with an overall record of 4–5–2 and a mark of 2–4–2 in conference play, tying for eighth place the Big Ten. Michigan State later forfeited all five of its victories, including their win over the Boilermakers, improving Purdue's record to 5–4–2 overall, 3–3–2 in conference play, and a tie for fifth place in the Big Ten standings. With the forfeit win, Purdue snapped a streak of nine consecutive losing seasons. The team played home games at Ross–Ade Stadium in West Lafayette, Indiana.

Schedule

Roster

Game summaries

Toledo
 Corey Rogers 18 rushes, 129 yards

Ball State
 Mike Alstott 19 rushes, 156 yards
 Corey Rogers 13 rushes, 124 yards

Iowa
 Mike Alstott 25 rushes, 138 yards

References

Purdue
Purdue Boilermakers football seasons
Purdue Boilermakers football